Mathil Mel Poonai is a 2013 Tamil language thriller film written and directed by Barani Jayapal. Vijay Vasanth and Vibha Natarajan play the lead roles in the film. The villains in the film are Karthik, Prabha, Ramesh. Thambi Ramayya and Meera Krishna share screen space also playing the key roles in the movie. The lyrics for Mathil Mel Punai have been penned by Yugabharathi and Thamarai. The Ganesh Raghavendra musical, LK Vijay cinematography and Praveen-Srikanth editorial is to hit the international screens on 8 March. The film is based on the 2008 British film Eden Lake. The film was panned by critics and became a box office bomb.

Cast
 Vijay Vasanth as Karthik
 Vibha Natarajan as Divya
 Karthik as Johnny
 Thambi Ramaiah
 G. Gnanasambandam as Divya's father
 Prabha
 Ramesh
 Neelima Rani
 Meera Krishnan
 Kamalakkannan
 Sairam Ramachandran

Production
The director is Bharani, who was an assistant of director Selvaraghavan. The film songs  received worse reviews than the film had received. The scenes were choreographed by Michael master. The film has been shot in Paramakudi, Courtallam, Kumbakonam, Pondicherry and Chennai. The crew spent the hardship of 75 days in thick forests for shooting. Shanthini Theva, who made her debut in Naadodigal, directed by Samuthirakani and produced by Sasikumar, was playing the heroine in Madhil Mel Poonai. But Vibha Natarajan became the heroine later.

Soundtrack

References

External links
 

2013 films
Indian thriller films
2013 thriller films
2010s Tamil-language films
2010s survival films